Eka Lagnachi Teesri Goshta was a 2013 Indian Marathi TV series that aired on Zee Marathi from Monday to Saturday. It is a Spin off from the serial Eka Lagnachi Dusri Goshta. The show premiered from 14 October 2013 by replacing Tuza Maza Jamena and ended on 16 August 2014. 

The show follows two young lawyers, Om and Isha who fall in love with each. The show witnessed a dip in ratings when the lead couple was shown at loggerheads with each other. As people relish Isha and Om's onscreen romance, that is exactly what the show's makers are providing them with.

Cast 
 Umesh Kamat as Om Chaudhari
 Spruha Joshi as Isha Deshmukh
 Tushar Dalvi as Ajit Chaudhari
 Mohan Joshi as Dattaram Newale (Datta Bhau)
 Shilpa Tulaskar as Gauri Panse-Chaudhari
 Sagar Talashilkar as Ranjeet Chaudhari
 Mohan Agashe as Prabhakar Deshmukh
 Rama Joshi as Isha's grandmother
 Shubhangi Gokhale as Shobhana
 Shubha Khote as Pramila Desai
 Sandesh Kulkarni as Jayesh
 Sneha Majgaonkar as Dhanashri
 Anita Date-Kelkar as Ashwini Ketkar
 Aarti Wadgabalkar as Madhu
 Sunil Abhyankar as Shrikant Bramhe
 Milind Phatak as Ulhas Pradhan
 Ajit Kelkar as Vasant Deshmukh
 Prasanna Ketkar as Satyajeet Chaudhari
 Anil Gawas as Shantaram Newale
 Rohit Haldikar as Sameer Chaudhari
 Sudeep Modak as Sagar
 Vishal Upasni as Om's office's peon
 Kishor Kadam as Sushant
 Uma Sardeshmukh as Alka Deshmukh (Isha's mother)
 Uma Gokhale as Uma Deshmukh (Isha's aunt) 
 Ketaki Saraf as Deepa Deshmukh (Isha's sister-in-law)
 Ramesh Medhekar as Sadashiv Kamat
 Gautam Murudeshwar as Hemant Deshmukh (Isha's father)

Dubbed version

References

External links 
 
 
 Eka Lagnachi Teesri Goshta at ZEE5

Marathi-language television shows
2013 Indian television series debuts
Indian television spin-offs
Zee Marathi original programming
2014 Indian television series endings